The White Roses of Ravensberg (German: Die weißen Rosen von Ravensberg) is a 1929 German silent drama film directed by Rudolf Meinert and starring Diana Karenne, Viola Garden and Jack Trevor. The film was shot at the Staaken Studios in Berlin. It was based on the 1887 novel The White Roses of Ravensberg by Eufemia von Adlersfeld-Ballestrem which had previously been made into a film in 1919.

Cast
 Diana Karenne as Maria von Ravensberg 
 Viola Garden as Sigrid von Erlenstein 
 Jack Trevor as Dr. Marcel Hochwald 
 Walter Janssen as Graf von Erlenstein 
 Dolly Davis as Iris von Ravensberg 
 Luigi Serventi as von Kurla 
 Willi Forst as Boris 
 Emil Heyse as Jacob 
 John Mylong as  Andreas, der Gärtner

References

Bibliography
 Prawer, S.S. Between Two Worlds: The Jewish Presence in German and Austrian Film, 1910-1933. Berghahn Books, 2007.

External links

1929 films
1929 drama films
German drama films
Films of the Weimar Republic
German silent feature films
Films directed by Rudolf Meinert
Films based on German novels
German black-and-white films
Remakes of German films
Silent drama films
Films shot at Staaken Studios
1920s German films
1920s German-language films